is a 1973 feature-length Japanese film directed by Kon Ichikawa. It is set during the early nineteenth century in rural Japan.

Cast
 Kenichi Hagiwara
Isao Bito
Ichiro Ogura

References

External links

1970s Japanese-language films
1973 films
Japanese avant-garde and experimental films
Films directed by Kon Ichikawa
1970s avant-garde and experimental films
1970s Japanese films